East Ridge is a neighborhood of Accra, Ghana bounded to the south and East by Sir Charles Quist Street. Independence Avenue serves as the district's western boundary.  Castle Road separates East Ridge from the northern neighborhood of Osu.

Originally planned as an extension to the historic Victoriaborg neighborhood, East Ridge is being transformed into a commercial and leisure district of Accra with the siting of the National Theatre and Efua Sutherland Children's Park in the neighborhood.

East Ridge also hosts an entire area of government offices known as the "Ministries." With the recent plans to redevelop the racecourse into a mixed-used commercial area anchored by the new Kempinski Gold Coast City hotel, provision has been made to relocate ministries to be affected by the development.

The area of East Ridge, North Ridge, and West Ridge is collectively referred to as "The Ridge."  This area is populated by several major embassies, including those of Germany and the United Kingdom. In addition, several of Accra's upmarket hotels, and several Ghanaian administrative offices are located in this neighborhood.

Landmarks/Places of Interest
 Efua Sutherland Children's park
 National Theatre
 Ohene Djan Stadium
 Accra International Conference Centre
 State House
 Parliament House
 College of Surgeons and Physicians
 Kofi Annan Centre of Excellence

References

Neighborhoods of Accra